The following is a list of the 98 municipalities (comuni) of the Province of Verona, Veneto, Italy.

List

See also 
 List of communes of Italy

References 

 01
Verona